

Codes

References

J